Leslie James Seth-Smith (12 January 1923 – 5 November 2007), known as James Brabazon, was a screenwriter and the author of two well-received biographies of Albert Schweitzer and Dorothy L. Sayers.  He also compiled and translated some of Albert Schweitzer's writings in Albert Schweitzer:
Essential Writings.

He died on 5 November 2007 after a short illness due to lung cancer.

His uncle David Seth-Smith was known as the 'Zoo man', and his great grandfather was Seth Smith (property developer), who built large proportions of Belgravia & Mayfair in the West End of London, in the mid 19th century.

References

External links
 James Brabazon - Writer and Producer
 

1923 births
2007 deaths
British biographers
Fellows of the Royal Society of Literature
Deaths from lung cancer in England
20th-century British screenwriters